Joanne Koenders (Arnhem, 28 February 1997) is a Dutch water polo goalkeeper for the Polar Bears in Ede, Netherlands. Previously she played for ENC Arnhem.
With Polar Bears, Koenders won the 2018 Dutch Championship and the 2019 KNZB Cup.

Koenders was first selected for the Dutch national team in 2017. She was part of the Dutch team that participated in the 2019 World Championships.

References

1997 births
Living people
Dutch female water polo players
Sportspeople from Arnhem
Water polo goalkeepers
Water polo players at the 2020 Summer Olympics
Olympic water polo players of the Netherlands